The 1937 Cal Aggies football team represented the Northern Branch of the College of Agriculture—now known as the University of California, Davis—as a member of the Far Western Conference (FWC) during the 1937 college football season. Led by first-year head coach Vern Hickey, the Aggies compiled an overall record of 4–4 with a mark of 2–2 in conference play, placing third in the FWC. The team was outscored by its opponents 87 to 63 for the season. The Cal Aggies played home games at A Street field on campus in Davis, California.

Schedule

Notes

References

Cal Aggies
UC Davis Aggies football seasons
Cal Aggies football